George Heald (2 June 1816 – 25 May 1858) was a civil engineer active at the beginning of the 19th century, notable for his role in the building of railways that formed part of the Grand Junction Railway, the Lancaster and Carlisle Railway, the Caledonian Railway and the North Midland Railway.  Nowadays he is largely forgotten but to his contemporaries and those that followed immediately afterwards, he was one of the key engineers of the early railway age being listed alongside Brunel, Stephenson, Locke and Cubitt in George Drysdale Dempsey's book, the Practical Railway Engineer. He was a colleague and friend of Robert Stephenson and also worked with other notable railway engineers such as Joseph Locke and Thomas Brassey.

Early years 

George was born and raised in Wakefield, Yorkshire.  His father, Thomas Heald, was a wealthy hatter and parfumier.  Thomas Heald's business interests involved travelling to London. After he was widowed he married Sarah Murray of Westminster, London who was eighteen years his junior.  George was born to Sarah and was raised in a small family with nine out of ten elder step-siblings having died.  The family was well educated and Sarah and her sister, Ann, ran a school founded under the auspices of the Gaskell family that included Elizabeth Gaskell, at Thornes near Wakefield.  George was educated from a young age in this environment and achieved a high competence in maths as his published material demonstrates.

Railway Engineer 

By 1839 he was a qualified civil engineer and made a presentation to the Institution of Civil Engineers in London about the Land Surveyors Calculator. Unlike some of his early contemporaries in the construction of railways who were practical men, George Heald was concerned with the theory and science of railway construction.  Two surviving publications demonstrate his interest in communicating the principles of railway construction.  In 1838 he published a booklet entitled, "Description and use of Heald's Universal Scale for measuring earthworks". A further book was published by Weale and Co. of London, technical and medical publishers, in 1847, "A complete and much improved system of setting out railway curves. Comprising, at one, brevity, simplicity and accuracy".

Heald was a highly regarded teacher in the field of railway civil engineering.  Richard Price-Williams an honorary fellow of the Institute of Mechanical Engineers, who in 1866 persuaded the railway companies to use steel rails, cited George Heald on more than one occasion.  In an interview given in 1894 Price-Williams said he began his career with 'the eminent engineer George Heald who was responsible for the construction of so many of the great British railways'. In Price-Williams' obituary of 1916 the author said that he had been 'a pupil of the late Mr. George Heald, M. Inst. C.E., on the construction of the Lancaster, Carlisle, and Caledonian Railways in the forties of the last century'.

In 1841 George was living at home in Wakefield with his mother and sister, Eliza.  On the census his profession was described as a land surveyor.  At this time he was one of three resident engineers employed in building the North Midland Railway.  On 14 July 1841 a celebration in honour of the resident engineers was held by the contractors at the Strafford Arms Hotel in Wakefield.    It was a lavish affair to celebrate the completion of the railway.  It was attended by Mr Houldsworth the Wakefield MP, and engineers from other railway companies such as the Midland Counties Railway (Mr Woodhouse), the Manchester and Leeds Railway (Mr Forsyth) and the Sheffield and Rotherham Railway (Mr Dobbs).  Two of Heald’s long-term associates, both contractors, are also listed: Taylor Stephenson (who reported his death in 1858) and George Mould.

He held the post of civil engineer on the North Midland Railway between Barnsley and Leeds until at least 1843 when he applied for the post of Borough Surveyor with the Council of the Borough of Leeds and made the shortlist of four. He was unsuccessful with the post being awarded to another railway engineer.

From the mid-1840s Heald was active in the construction of the main line between Lancaster and Carlisle in conjunction with Joseph Locke, Thomas Brassey, William Mackenzie and John Stephenson.

In 1844, together with Joseph Locke, Thomas Brassey and John Stephenson, he constructed the Kendal and Windermere Railway, a branch line of the Lancaster and Carlisle Railway. The opening of the railway was celebrated with a dinner at the Crown Hotel, Bowness.  This event was attended by Mr. Watson, resident engineer, Mr. George Heald, Mr. John Hudson, Mr. Thomas Hudson, secretary to the company, Mr. Miles Thompson (the builder of the stations), Mr. Wm. Rawlinson and Mr. Hunt, of the London and North Western locomotive department.  Watson paid tribute to Heald for his work in engineering the line while Heald in turn paid tribute to his predecessor, Joseph Locke.  The toasts were proposed to the contractors, particularly Mr. Heald and Mr. Rawlinson.  A further toast was made to Messrs. Brassey, Mackenzie, and Stephenson, and to couple the toast with the names of Mr. Heald and Mr. Rawlinson.
The view was that this railway was a triumph of engineering – "This had been called the gem of railways, and the part of the contractors had been to brush away the dross, to bring the gem out of its natural habitat, and present it before their eyes in all its beauty."

However, not everybody agreed.  This railway was vigorously opposed by William Wordsworth who wrote a sonnet bemoaning the coming of the railway.  His letters to the editor of the Morning Post are reproduced in The Illustrated Wordsworth's Guide to the Lakes, P. Bicknell, Ed. (Congdon and Weed, New York, 1984), pp. 186–198. His reactions to the technological and "picturesque" incursions of man on his beloved, wild landscape most famously include the following sonnet:
     Is then no nook of English ground secure
     From rash assault? Schemes of retirement sown
     In youth, and 'mid the busy world kept pure
     As when their earliest flowers of hope were blown,
     Must perish;—how can they this blight endure?
     And must he too the ruthless change bemoan
     Who scorns a false utilitarian lure
     'Mid his paternal fields at random thrown?
     Baffle the threat, bright Scene, from Orresthead
     Given to the pausing traveller's rapturous glance:
     Plead for thy peace, thou beautiful romance
     Of nature; and, if human hearts be dead,
     Speak, passing winds; ye torrents, with your strong
     And constant voice, protest against the wrong.
On the opening of the railway in 1847 George Heald wrote an impassioned riposte to Wordsworth accusing the poet of wanting to obstruct the opportunities and freedom that the railway would bring for ordinary people. His poem is dated 15 April 1847. He argues for the democratising influence of the railway and the cultural and social benefits it will bring rather than the economic reasons that might be expected from a railway engineer:

During 1845 and 1846 Heald was Thomas Brassey's engineer during the difficult construction of the Caledonian Railway from Carlisle to Glasgow.

In May 1846, while staying in the Imperial Hotel at Covent Garden, Heald wrote a letter to George Mould in Carlisle.  The contents of the letter indicate that Heald was drawing up plans for the North Western Railway; or more precisely the Little North Western Railway.  It is evident that Mould is the contractor for the railway and he has been asked to reduce the cost of the railway.  He has been charged with designing a railway that will be constructed for £800,000.  Heald's answer suggests that this figure is too low and impossible to achieve: 
I have calculated the differences that would be made in the masonry supporting all the bridges were square instead of a good number being skew, and taking the lengths of all culverts as being adapted to embankments where the slopes are one and a half to one instead of two to one. And respecting the alteration that could be made in the earthworks of the present section by employing steeper gradients it is not probable that (without increasing the amount of the embankments) they could by any alteration get rid of the present amount of spoil 1,432,275 c.yds and at the same time dispense with the side cutting of 336,185 c.yds.

But, if these impossibilities could be surmounted the estimate might be reduced from £1,258,519 to £1,076,433 leaving it still £276, 433 above Mr. Watson's limits of £800,000.

George Heald worked closely with William Mackenzie from 1848. Mackenzie's diary records Heald dining at Mackenzie's house in Liverpool..  During 1849 Heald went, on two occasions, with Mackenzie and Brassey to consult with lawyers in Carlisle.  All of these men were involved at that time in building railways in Lancashire and northwards into Scotland.  In 1851 Heald was working in Liverpool, staying on the night of the census, at the Royal Waterloo Hotel in Great Crosby.  He was described as a civil engineer and he was accompanied by a land agent, George Williams.  He was almost certainly working on the Liverpool, Crosby & Southport Railway which was begun by George Robert Stephenson in 1848.

There is little information so far found about his activities during the 1850s.  It seems that his career was cut short.  In 1851 he wrote his last will and testament.  He was just 34 years old and yet he bequeathed his entire estate to his mother, Sarah, who was 71 years old.  It is evident that George was a sick man and didn't expect to live much longer.  He had contracted tuberculosis.  In the event he lasted another seven years and outlived his mother.  His estate passed to his sister, Eliza.  In his last engineering project he was engaged as the civil engineer for the construction of the Cannock Mineral Railway by the railway contractor, Taylor Robinson Stephenson.  However Heald's health declined further and around the end of 1857 Thomas Brassey was engaged to complete the task. Heald died in May 1858 at Market Street, Rugeley, Staffordshire.  He was 41 years old.  His death was reported by T. R. Stephenson.

George Heald the man 
George Heald left no written account of his life.  The reason for this was his busy professional life and his early death.  Being unmarried his only surviving relatives consisted of just two siblings; his sister Eliza who was a spinster and his step-brother Charles who had been estranged from the family having gone to sea as a ship's captain and had led a disreputable life that included bigamous marriage and a spell in a debtors' prison in Calcutta. Heald also did not hold public office like some of his contemporaries.  He died away from his origins in Wakefield and it seems nobody wrote an obituary.  And yet we can tell much about him.  There is no doubt of his intelligence and education.  He could switch between advanced maths and poetic riposte with ease.  His answer to Wordsworth seems to be the only piece of writing he left beyond his professional engineering publications.  It is also evident from the memoirs of others that he was held in high regard and affection by his fellow engineers.

Legacy 
George Heald was one of the pre-eminent railway engineers of the early nineteenth century.  In the preface to his book, The Practical Railway Engineer which was published in 1855, George Drysdale Dempsey names the key engineers that powered the development of the railways.  He naturally cites famous engineers like George Stephenson, Robert Stephenson, Isambard Kingdom Brunel, Joseph Locke and William Cubitt as well as George Heald. Heald's legacy is in two parts.  He was a prolific engineer who built many major railways with the Stephensons, Joseph Locke and Thomas Brassey.  Notable among these is the northern part of the West Coast Main Line that is still a key element of British railway infrastructure 170 years after its construction.  But he also laid the foundations for other engineers by developing techniques such as the land surveyors calculator and the mathematical method for calculating curves on railways.  He also had the ability to communicate these methods in presentations and through publication.  Techniques like these enabled the railways to be built along scientific principles rather than the frequently rough and ready measures used in the earliest days.  It was part of a progression to faster and safer rail transport.

References

Bibliography used for notes 
 The land surveyor's calculator – author: George Heald, Source: Minutes of the Proceedings, Volume 1, Issue 1838, 1 January 1838, page 25 (Institution of Civil Engineers)
 A Complete and Much Improved System of Setting Out Railway Curves, Comprising at One Brevity, Simplicity and Accuracy – Weale & Co., London, 1847 – 11 pages Second edition  (Copy at British Library, St Pancras, London)
 Description and Use of Heald's Universal Scale for Measuring Earthwork – the Author, Thornes Wakefield 1838 (Copy at Manchester University Library)
 Evening Post, Rōrahi XLVII, Putanga 63, 15 Poutūterangi 1894 (NZ), Page 4 Railways, Settlement, And Coal. A Chat With Mr. Price-Williams. (http://paperspast.natlib.govt.nz/cgi-bin/paperspast?a=d&d=EP18940315.2.41&l=mi&e=-------10--1----2--)
 A Well-Spent Life. Memoir Of Cornelius Nicholson, J P., D.L., F.G.S., F S.A. With A Selection Of His Lectures And Letters. Published by T. Wilson, Kendal, 1890
 Obituary. Richard Price-Williams, 1827–1916. Author: unknown, Source: Minutes of the Proceedings of the Institution of Civil Engineers, Volume 203, Issue 1917, 1 January 1917, page 421 (http://www.imeche.org/knowledge/library/institution-and-engineering-history/honorary-fellows)
 The Practical Railway Engineer by G. Drysdale Dempsey, John Weale, London, 1855 (https://books.google.com//www.steamindex.com/people/stephen.htm)
 Reply to Wordsworth's sonnet on the Kendal & Windermere Railway by George Heald, Orrest Head : s.n. 1847.  Located in the Brotherton Special Collections, University of Leeds (Shelf mark: Collection Gen WOR/H)

1816 births
1858 deaths
Engineers from Yorkshire
British railway civil engineers
People from Wakefield
British railway pioneers
19th-century deaths from tuberculosis
Tuberculosis deaths in England
19th-century British businesspeople